Manitoba Blizzard are a Junior B box lacrosse team based in Winnipeg, Manitoba. The Blizzard compete in the Rocky Mountain Lacrosse League.

History 
Formed in 2010 as the Manitoba Gryphons, the team was the first Manitoba-based team to join the Rocky Mountain Lacrosse League. After a two-year probationary period the Gryphons were granted full league membership for the 2012 season in which they finished 10-9-0, sixth best in the 10-team league. They Gryphons were eliminated in the first round of the playoffs.

The Gryphons hosted Founders Cup 2013 in Winnipeg finishing in fifth place. The team would see ownership/management changes in the off-season and were renamed the Blizzard. The club also relocated from their original home in Oakbank to Notre Dame Arena.

As the lone Junior B team in the province, the Gryphons/Blizzard annually represent Manitoba at Founders Cup. The team has played for the Bronze medal on four occasions falling short each time.

It hosted the Founders Cup 2019 in Winnipeg.

Season-by-season

Founders Cup
CANADIAN NATIONAL CHAMPIONSHIPS

References

External links 
 Manitoba Blizzard website

Lacrosse teams in Canada
Sports clubs established in 2010
2010 establishments in Canada
Sports teams in Winnipeg